Lake Thibadeau National Wildlife Refuge is a  National Wildlife Refuge in the U.S. state of Montana,  northeast of Havre, Montana. This refuge is a part of the Bowdoin Wetland Management District (WMD), and is managed from Bowdoin National Wildlife Refuge. The refuge is an easement refuge almost entirely on privately owned property and consists of grassland, marshes and cropland.

References

External links
 Lake Thibadeau National Wildlife Refuge

Protected areas of Hill County, Montana
National Wildlife Refuges in Montana
Wetlands of Montana
Landforms of Hill County, Montana